José Ayerve (born April 28, 1974) is a recording artist/singer and songwriter and the front man for northeast-based indie rock groups Spouse and Nuclear Waste Management Club. He has released a number of singles and albums on vinyl and CD and is a frequent collaborator with a number of musicians and bands (see Discography).

In addition, Ayerve is a recording engineer and producer for not only his own projects, but also for artists that include Winterpills, Lo Fine, Sometymes Why, Pernice Brothers, Katie Sawicki Dennis Crommett, New Radiant Storm King, Michael Merenda, and Kristen Gass.

He has also helped co-write the single "Pega Luna Manny" along with Joe Pernice of the Pernice Brothers, a song about former Boston Red Sox player Manny Ramírez. which enjoyed moderate success when the Boston Red Sox won the world series that year, for the first time in 86 years.  It was included in the credit roll at the end of the 2005 film, Fever Pitch.

Biography
José Ayerve was born in Bogotá, Colombia on April 28, 1974, though his family soon relocated first to Springfield, Massachusetts, then Quito, Ecuador before again returning to Springfield.

Ayerve began studying music at the age of nine. He transitioned from piano to guitar at 13, and became a multi-instrumentalist by the time he reached college in 1992.   After 1992 he relocated to Portland, Maine and would eventually join the Portland-based group Bullyclub in 1999.  Though Ayerve has performed with innumerable bands throughout his career, his main pursuit since 1995 has been the schizophrenic, indie-pop group, Spouse.  He currently resides in Western Massachusetts, but spends much of his time touring and/or collaborating on various projects.

Discography

Albums 
Cinco Pesos (as José Ignacio Ayerve, released: 01/02, Pigeon Records)
Nozomi (with Spouse) released: 09/00, Pigeon Records)
Love Can't Save This Love (with Spouse released: 02/02, Pigeon Records)
Catch 22 (with Spouse released: 01/04, Pigeon Records)
Are You Gonna Kiss or Wave Goodbye? (with Spouse, released: 09/2004, Pigeon Records)
Relocation Tactics (with Spouse, released 3/07, Pigeon Records)
The Nuclear Waste Management Club (as José Ayerve, released: 11/08, Pigeon Records)

Singles
Marvel to DC (7" vinyl single, released: 04/99, Pigeon Records)
Wonder Woman
X-Man (I Want To Be an...)
Superman)
Focus 7" vinyl single, released: 04/99, Pigeon Records)
Focus
Harry Crooker, FLA
Marbles

With other artists

Sometymes Why
Your Heart is a Glorious Machine (released: 03/10/2009, Signature Sounds)
produced by José Ayerve, engineered by Max Feldman

Haunt
The Deep North (10/2008, Nine Mile Records)
J.Ayerve: producer, bass, electric guitars, sk-5, backing vocals

Katie Sawicki
Time Spent Lost (05/2008, self-release)
J.Ayerve: producer, bass, backing vocals, sk-5

Bullyclub
Like Songs (released: 06/2001, Pigeon Records)
Tender Hooks (released: 02/2003, Pigeon Records)

Chappaquiddick Skyline
Chappaquiddick Skyline, released: 2000
J.Ayerve: b.vocals on "Knights of the Night, Vol III"

Lo Fine
Slow To a Crawl (released: 11/2002, Pigeon Records)
recorded & produced by José Ayerve, Kevin O'Rourke, & Bruce Tull
J. Ayerve: bass, sk-5, charango
Not For Us Two  (released 4/2008, Pigeon Records)
recorded & produced by Kevin O'Rourke and Mark Alan Miller.
J. Ayerve:  b.vocals on "Damage Twins", "Over My Shoulder", "My Favorite Illusion (Not For Us Two)".

New Radiant Storm King
Winters Kill (released: 04/2002, Rainbow Quartz)
recorded by Thom Monahan, Mark Alan Miller, and José Ayerve
J. Ayerve: b.vocals on "Golden Parachute", tape manipulations on "Constellation Prize"

Winterpills
Winterpills (released: 11/08/2005, Signature Sounds/Soft Alarm)
recorded, produced, and mixed by José Ayerve, additional mixing by Dave Chalfant
The Light Divides (released: 02/27/2007, Signature Sounds/Soft Alarm)
J.Ayerve: co-production, bass, backing vocals

External links
Jose Ayerve's official site
Spouse official site 
Pigeon Records official site 

1974 births
Living people
American indie rock musicians